The circle style Asia Kabaddi Cup, is a regional kabaddi competition administrated by the Pakistan Kabaddi Federation contested by national teams within the continent of Asia. The competition has been contested in 2011, 2012 Asia Kabaddi Cup and 2016 Asia Kabaddi Cup.

The current format of the competition involves a round robin.

Summary

Medal table

See also
Kabaddi Asia Cup
2020 Kabaddi World Cup (Circle style)

References

livekabaddi
onlinekabaddi
kabaddi world cup
kabaddi Videos

External links
 Official Website
 World Cup 2007 Results
 World cup 2004 Results
 Kabaddi Players

World Cup
National kabaddi teams
2011 establishments in Asia